Wouter Corstjens (born 13 February 1987) is a Dutch-born Belgian football defender, who currently plays for K. Patro Eisden Maasmechelen on loan from Westerlo.

References

External links
 playerhistory.com– stats at playerhistory.com
 
 

1987 births
Living people
Belgian footballers
Belgium under-21 international footballers
Belgium youth international footballers
Belgian expatriate footballers
K.R.C. Genk players
K.V.C. Westerlo players
K.A.A. Gent players
Lierse S.K. players
S.K. Beveren players
Panetolikos F.C. players
Lommel S.K. players
K. Patro Eisden Maasmechelen players
Belgian Pro League players
Challenger Pro League players
Expatriate footballers in Greece
Association football defenders
Footballers from Maastricht